Kladno is a city in the Central Bohemian Region of the Czech Republic.

Kladno may also refer to the following places:
 Kladno District, part of the Central Bohemian Region
 Kladno (Chrudim District), a village in Pardubice Region, Czech Republic
 Kładno, Poland